Michael Delaney Dowd Jr. (August 11, 1921 – August 11, 2006), known as Mike Douglas, was an American "Big Band" era singer, entertainer, television talk show host of The Mike Douglas Show, and actor.

Early life

Dowd was born in Chicago, Illinois. His family later moved to Forest Park, Illinois. There, he attended Proviso Township High School, but left the school after his second year. After that, he began singing as a choirboy.

Early career
By his teens Dowd was working as a singer at nightclubs and on a Lake Michigan dinner cruise ship. He was a "staff singer" at the Oklahoma City radio station WKY. After serving in the United States Navy in World War II on a munitions ship, he resumed his performing career as a staff singer for WMAQ-TV in Chicago. He moved to Los Angeles, California. He was on the Ginny Simms radio show. After that, Douglas joined the big band of Kay Kyser as a singer.

Although big band swing faded from popularity, Kyser had to continue performing due to contractual obligations, and continued to log a few hits with Douglas, including two notable hits, "Ole [or Old] Buttermilk Sky" in 1946 and "The Old Lamp-Lighter" the following year. Kyser was responsible for giving him his show business name, and he continued to perform with the band until Kyser retired in 1951 due to health problems. In 1950, he provided the singing voice of Prince Charming in Walt Disney's Cinderella.

In 1953, Douglas was host of Showcase, a weekly program on WGN-TV in Chicago, and he sang on The Music Show on the DuMont Television Network.

Then living in Burbank, California, Douglas tried to keep his singing career going in the 1950s working as house singer for a nightclub and traveling to perform elsewhere. By the middle of the decade, rock and roll and doo wop had taken over the charts, which left many older performers in the musical dustbin. In the leanest years, Douglas and his wife survived by successfully "flipping" their Los Angeles homes.

Talk show
Douglas next surfaced in 1961 in Cleveland, where a onetime Chicago colleague hired him for $400 a week as an afternoon television talk-show host at KYW-TV. The Mike Douglas Show rapidly gained popularity, and ultimately, national syndication in August 1963 on other stations owned by KYW-TV's parent company Westinghouse Broadcasting. The show was broadcast live on KYW-TV in its city of origination, but this practice ended in 1965 after guest Zsa Zsa Gabor used the phrase "son of a bitch" when referring to stand-up comedian and comic actor Morey Amsterdam of the Dick Van Dyke Show.

Both Douglas and his program relocated to Philadelphia in 1965 after Westinghouse Broadcasting moved KYW-TV's operations to that city, the result an Federal Communications Commission-ordered reversal of Westinghouse's 1956 station ownership swap with NBC. The Mike Douglas Show  aired its first Philadelphia-based show on August 30, 1965; the former KYW-TV in Cleveland—now NBC-owned WKYC—continued to carry the program for many years afterward. Guests ranged from Truman Capote and Richard Nixon to The Rolling Stones, Herman's Hermits and Kiss, with an occasional on-camera appearance by Tim Conway (who would later be discovered at WJW-TV, also in Cleveland). Moe Howard of "Three Stooges" fame was a guest several times, with a pie-fight inevitably happening at the end of the interview, and platform speaker on nonverbal communication (body language) Dr. Cody Sweet.

The show helped introduce entertainers such as Barbra Streisand and Aretha Franklin. After the move to Philadelphia, Douglas also attempted to revive his own singing career, logging his lone Top 40 single as a solo artist, "The Men in My Little Girl's Life" in 1966. By 1967, The Mike Douglas Show was broadcast to 171 markets and 6,000,000 viewers each day, mostly women at home. It earned $10.5 million annually from advertisers, while its host was paid more than $500,000. In 1967, the program received the first Emmy Award for Individual Achievement in Daytime Television from the National Academy of Television Arts & Sciences. At the peak of his career, he was earning $2 million a year.

The afternoon show was usually quiet with an eclectic mix and such an approach would occasionally lead to confrontation, such as when Soul Singer James Brown took offense at racially -charged comments from talk show host / producer David Susskind who wondered on-air why Black students often did not mix with White students, even after Civil Rights legislation and advances in integration. It got heated when Brown defended those who chose to learn first about themselves, having been systematically denied to do so, for centuries. 

Douglas never “muzzled“ his guests, as flamboyant as many were. Pop-Soul Co - host Sly Stone's hyperactive behavior clashed with the comportment of Muhammad Ali, in a 1974 show. 

Little Richard, 1950's Rock and Roll originator, by 1969 was on a serious comeback bid and his many appearances with Douglas gave him a boost.

In 1970, Douglas hired rocker Bobby Darin as co-host, just after the latter radically changed his image from lounge entertainer to folk artist, Bob Darin. It appears, he would only sing his greatest hit “Mack the Knife”, if he could rewrite a verse to fit his changes. So Douglas was partially successful in expressing the wishes of fans, who demanded the original Bobby Darin.

Douglas had John Lennon and Yoko Ono on the show for a full week in 1972, and there were some awkward moments with Yoko's avant-garde art displays and with radical guests, John and Yoko's friends. 

In July 1978, the talk show's home base was transferred to Los Angeles, where it remained until finally going off the air in 1981. Near the end of its run, the series switched to a traveling roadshow format and became The Mike Douglas Entertainment Hour, but this change failed to boost falling ratings. After his series was cancelled, Douglas hosted CNN's Los Angeles-based celebrity interview show, People Now, taking over the hosting duties from Lee Leonard. He was replaced in January 1983 by WTBS personality Bill Tush.

Other notable achievements
Douglas became a local cultural icon in Philadelphia, often inviting prominent players from the city's professional sports teams to be guests on his show (he had a particular affinity for the city's pro football team, the Philadelphia Eagles, constantly referring to the team as "Our Eagles", and he could often be seen in attendance at Eagles' home games, especially whenever they appeared on Monday Night Football). He also assisted in mayor Frank Rizzo's campaign against derisive jokes often told by outsiders about the city, acting as chief spokesperson for the "Anti-Defamation Agency" Rizzo had set up for this purpose.  He also held a landmark interview with Dr. Martin Luther King that revealed his wisdom around civil rights and his prophetic stance on the Vietnam war. 

In February 1976 Hollywood recognized Douglas' contribution to television, honoring him with a star on the Hollywood Walk of Fame located on Hollywood Boulevard.

Douglas sang "The Star-Spangled Banner" before the first Philadelphia Phillies game at Veterans Stadium on April 10, 1971, and also sang the national anthem prior to a Cincinnati Bengals–Miami Dolphins playoff game on December 23, 1973. He wrote two memoirs: My Story (1979) and I'll Be Right Back: Memories of TV's Greatest Talk Show (1999). He also wrote a cookbook, The Mike Douglas Cookbook (1969), featuring recipes from him, his family, and the show's guests. 40 years after Douglas began his talk show at KYW-TV, his granddaughter Debbie Voinovich Donley designed successor WKYC's new broadcast facility on Lakeside Avenue, completed in 2002. In 2007, a new documentary film Mike Douglas: Moments and Memories was shown on PBS stations. The Lily Tomlin comedy The Incredible Shrinking Woman shows the dwindling Pat Kramer appearing on Douglas's show, where he sings "Little Things Mean a Lot" in her honor.

Personal Life and Death
Douglas married Genevieve, the marriage producing three daughters: Kelly and twins Michele and Christine, and he had several grandchildren and great-grandchildren.

Douglas developed prostate cancer in 1990, but after surgery he was cancer-free and remained in good health until almost the end of his life. He died unexpectedly on August 11, 2006, his 85th birthday, at Palm Beach Gardens Medical Center in Palm Beach Gardens, Florida. In media reports, he was sometimes claimed to be five years younger than his true age. He claimed to be 36 years old, instead of 40, when he got his show.

Although the exact cause of his death was not revealed, his widow, Genevieve, told the Associated Press that he became dehydrated while golfing a few weeks earlier on a hot Florida summer day. Douglas was treated at a hospital following this episode, but he was apparently unable to recover. His body was interred in Riverside Memorial Park cemetery in Martin County, Florida.

Legacy
The Broadcast Pioneers of Philadelphia posthumously inducted Douglas into their Hall of Fame in 2006.

Other television and film appearances
1969: The Mike Douglas Christmas Special
1971: The Last Valley as Stoffel (uncredited)
1976: Gator as The Governor
1981: Greatest American Hero; guest appearance in the season two premiere
1982: Knots Landing; episode: "Svengali"
1983: The Love Boat as Marv Mason

See also
 The Mike Douglas Show

References

External links

 Obituary, billboard.com; accessed 9 August 2015.
 WKYC-TV – Talk Show host Mike Douglas remembered, wkyc.com; accessed 9 August 2015.
 Profile, cbs3.com; accessed 9 August 2015.

1921 births
2006 deaths
20th-century American male actors
American television talk show hosts
American male voice actors
Epic Records artists
Male actors from Chicago
United States Navy sailors
United States Navy personnel of World War II